April Diamond is an American singer. Her first single release "Lose Control" debuted on the Billboard magazine chart under the Hot Dance Club Play category on January 6, 2018.

The song was written and produced by David Longoria and remixed by Robert Eibach, Dave Audé and others. It climbed that chart on Billboard peaking at #27 on February 3, 2018  and remained on the chart for a total of 8 weeks. "Lose Control" received a nomination in the category of "Best Dance Song" in the 2017 Hollywood Music In Media Awards.

Diamond received two nominations for the category of "Best Electronica/Dance Artist" and one win for the category of "Best Female Pop Artist Of The Year" from the Los Angeles Music Awards. 
   
Diamond was also featured on the theme song "Now Or Never" from the movie "Bloodline: Now Or Never" along with David Longoria, who also wrote the song.

She sang on the recording of the song ""We Are One"" with David Longoria and more than 750 other artists and performed the song on the lawn of the White House on May 20th, 2017.  

in 2022 Diamond released her single Feels So Good on Del Oro Music. The song was written by David Longoria and produced by Longoria and Robert Eibach. The song was remixed by remixers Chuda Beat, hi5, Robert Eibach and others.

https://www.billboard.com/charts/dance-club-play-songs/2018-02-24

References

1986 births
Living people
21st-century American singers
21st-century American women singers